Selling Out is a 1972 Canadian short film for cinema and TV produced and directed by Tadeusz Jaworski, and written by Jaworski and Jack Winter. 

At the 45th Academy Awards in 1973, it was nominated for an Academy Award (Short Subject), and was named Best Documentary at the 24th Canadian Film Awards.

The film was sponsored by the Humber College of Applied Arts and Technology and is about a Prince Edward Island farmer who, because his children have moved away, must sell the farm that has been in his family for generations. It raises the question of whether government should prevent the sale of Canadian farms to non-Canadians.

References

External links

Selling Out at the Canadian Educational, Sponsored, and Industrial Film Project

1972 films
1970s short documentary films
English-language Canadian films
Canadian short documentary films
Best Short Documentary Film Genie and Canadian Screen Award winners
1970s English-language films
1970s Canadian films